is a railway station on the Tadami Line in the town of Aizubange, Fukushima Prefecture, Japan, operated by East Japan Railway Company (JR East).

Lines

Station layout
Aizu-Bange Station has two opposed side platforms, connected to the station building by a level crossing. The station has a Midori no Madoguchi staffed ticket office.

Platforms

History
The station was absorbed into the JR East network upon the privatization of the JNR on April 1, 1987.

Passenger statistics
In fiscal 2017, the station was used by an average of 385 passengers daily (boarding passengers only).

Surrounding area

Aizubange Town Hall
Bange Post Office
Aizubange Public Gymnasium

Hachiro Kasuga Memorial Museum

See also
 List of railway stations in Japan

References

External links
 JR East station information 

Railway stations in Fukushima Prefecture
Tadami Line
Railway stations in Japan opened in 1926
Stations of East Japan Railway Company
Aizubange, Fukushima